The 19th Michigan Infantry Regiment was an infantry regiment that served in the Union Army during the American Civil War.

Service
The 19th Michigan Infantry was mustered into Federal service at Dowagiac, Michigan, on September 5, 1862. Among the soldiers was Frank Baldwin, who would go on to become one of only nineteen men to ever receive two Medal of Honor citations, one for the Civil War and another after the war while fighting the Indians in the U.S. Cavalry.

At the Battle of Thompson's Station, March 5th, 1863, the regiment was captured.  Losses were 20 killed, 92 wounded, 345 captured, total 457.

The regiment was mustered out of service on June 10, 1865.

Total strength and casualties
The regiment suffered 7 officers and 88 enlisted men who were killed in action or mortally wounded and 160 enlisted men who died of disease, for a total of 255 
fatalities.

Commanders
Colonel Henry C. Gilbert
Lieutenant Colonel William R. Shafter

See also
List of Michigan Civil War Units
Michigan in the American Civil War

Notes

References
The Civil War Archive
CIVIL WAR INDEX
The Civil War-Battle Unit Details-UNION MICHIGAN VOLUNTEERS

Further reading
Lester, Robert, and Gary Hoag. Civil War Unit Histories [Part 4], The Union, Midwest and West . Bethesda, Md: University Publications of America, 1994. 
Michigan, and George H. Turner. Record of Service of Michigan Volunteers in the Civil War, 1861-1865 [Nineteenth Infantry]. Lansing, Mich.: [Michigan Adjutant-General's Dept.], 1905.   
Rice, Franklin G. Diary of 19th Michigan Volunteer Infantry During Their Three Years Service in the War of the Rebellion. Big Rapids, Mich.?: s.n, 1970. 

Units and formations of the Union Army from Michigan
1865 disestablishments in Michigan
1862 establishments in Michigan
Military units and formations established in 1862
Military units and formations disestablished in 1865